This page lists the World Best Year Performance in the year 2001 in both the men's and the women's race walking distances: 20 km and 50 km (outdoor). One of the main events during this season were the 2001 World Athletics Championships in Edmonton, Alberta, Canada.

Abbreviations
All times shown are in hours:minutes:seconds

Men's 20 km

Records

2001 World Year Ranking

Men's 50 km

Records

2001 World Year Ranking

Women's 20 km

Records

2001 World Year Ranking

References
IAAF
Women's 20 km Year Ranking

2001
Race Walking Year Ranking, 2001